The 2004 Wellington City mayoral election was part of the 2004 New Zealand local elections. On 9 October 2004, elections were held for the Mayor of Wellington plus other local government roles. Kerry Prendergast was re-elected for a second term as mayor of Wellington. This was the first Wellington mayoral election to be held under the Instant runoff voting system.

Candidates
There were seven candidates nominated for the election:

Bryon Charles Burke, a Newtown environmentalist
Rob Goulden, Councillor for the Eastern Ward since 1998
Stephen Hay, an unemployed film-maker stood for the Anti-Capitalist Alliance
Timothy O'Brien, a writer and broadcaster from Mount Cook
Kerry Prendergast, Incumbent Mayor since 2001
Bryan Pepperell, Councillor for the Southern Ward since 1996
Jack Ruben, former city councillor

Bryon Burke withdrew from the Mayoral election on 13 September 2004.

Results

Ward results

Candidates were also elected from wards to the Wellington City Council.

References

Mayoral elections in Wellington
2004 elections in New Zealand
Politics of the Wellington Region
2000s in Wellington